Mistral is an Australian home appliances brand which manufactures kitchen appliances, heating and cooling fans, air fryers, thermo cookers, electronics, and other appliances. Mistral was established in 1968.  It is a subsidiary of Gerard Sourcing & Manufacturing.

Mistral products are sold by Aldi, Woolworths Supermarkets, Bunnings Warehouse, Australia Post, The Reject Shop.Quoted from the Mistral website: "Mistral has become a staple household Australian brand, with 9/10 Australians recalling the brand, and 7 out of 10 Australians having owned a product"
Mistral has been a sponsor of the Adelaide Crows, and have also sponsored the boat that Jesse Martin used when he held the record as the youngest person to sail around the world solo.

Mistral was purchased by Gerard Industries in 1990, while being managed by Robert Gerard.

See also 

 Magnavox
 A. E. Gerard
 Robert Gerard
 Simon Gerard

References 

Australian brands
1968 establishments in Australia
Australian companies established in 1968
Manufacturing companies established in 1968
1990 mergers and acquisitions